The Air Barons were  an aerobatics team of the United States Navy, which was active  from 1958 to 1971. The team was initially equipped with Grumman F9F-6 Cougars. The Air Barons were the aerobatics team of the Naval Air Reserve and thus the second aerobatic team of the US Navy along with the Blue Angels.

History 
In contrast to the Blue Angels, which also flew the A-4 at the same time, the Air Barons always flew with an additional tank under each wing, while the Blue Angels used external transfer tanks only for transfer flights and carried out the actual flight demonstrations completely without external loads. One of the 6 A-4 also had an air to air refueling unit  at the centerlinepylon. In contrast to the full-service military pilots of the Blue Angels, which only operate aerobatics during their classification at the Blue Angels, the pilots of the Air Barons were active as pilots of the Naval Air Reserve only as part-time military pilots. The Air Barons aerobatic team flew 66 official flight demonstrations during its existence.

External links
Text and pictures about the Air Barons

References
Tommy H Thomason, SCOOTER!, The Douglas A-4 Skyhawk Story. Crécy Publishing LTD1973, (Page 203)
Wings at the Ready, U.S. Naval Institute, Annapolis, MD, pp. 130–131, c1991, 

Aircraft squadrons of the United States Navy
American aerobatic teams
Ceremonial units of the United States military